Eulima glabra (Dutch: grote glanshoren) is a species of small parasitic sea snail, a marine gastropod mollusk in the family Eulimidae. The species is one of a number within the genus Eulima.

Description
The length of the shell measures approximately 10 mm. The shell is tall, sharply pointed, slender, very glossy and nearly transparent; whorls flat-sided, sutures nearly invisible; no ornamentation. The aperture is a long and narrow, pointed apically; outer lip nearly straight in side view and forming a shallow, open canal basally. The shell has up to 12 Whorls, 3 or 4 belonging to the protoconch, but these, which are a little tumid, are often broken off. The last whorl is slender and, in apertural view, the outer lip continues the profile of the spire. Its edge is rounded, not sharp. There are a few irregular growth lines on the shell and occasional prosocline and nearly straight markings which show former positions of the outer lip. The last whorl occupies about half of the shell's height, the aperture a third.

Color
The vast majority of specimens appear as yellow-white, with orange-brown bands. Usually there are 3 spiral bands on each whorl of the spire, up to 6 on the last whorl of the shell. Some brown spiral lines, especially those at the periphery, may be represented by separate streaks which curve axially.

Soft parts
The head is a thin ledge carrying the opening of an introvert on its underside and a pair of tentacles anteriorly. These are long and tapering, each with an eye behind and medial to its base. A pallial tentacle arises from the mantle edge on the right. In males (small, young animals) a penis with an open seminal groove on its dorsal side arises behind the right tentacle; in females (larger, older) a vestige of this persists. The foot is large but narrow, broad anteriorly, with conspicuous opercular lobes behind. The animal is white.

Habitat

Eulima glabra is ectoparasitic on echinoderms, probably ophiuroids, and live sublittorally to depths of approximately 200 m. The animals are consecutive hermaphrodites and the life history probably includes a free veliger stage.

Distribution
This marine species ranges from the Mediterranean to the British Isles where it has been found from south-west England, the south and west of Ireland, as far north as Shetland; not in the southern North Sea.

This species occurs in the following locations:

 British Isles
 European waters (ERMS scope)
 Greek Exclusive Economic Zone
 Irish Exclusive Economic Zone
 United Kingdom Exclusive Economic Zone

References

External links
 Forbes, E. (1838). Malacologia Monensis: a catalogue of the Mollusca inhabiting the Isle of Man and the neighbouring sea. Edinburgh: J. Carfrae and son pp. XII + 63 + 3 pl
 Donovan E. (1799-1804). The natural history of British shells: including figures and descriptions of all the species hitherto discovered in Great Britain, systematically arranged in the Linnean manner, with scientific and general observations on each. 5 volumes, London, printed for the Author, and for F. and C. Rivington, 180 plates with unpaginated text.
  Da Costa, Mendes E. (1778). Historia naturalis testaceorum Britanniæ, or, the British conchology; containing the descriptions and other particulars of natural history of the shells of Great Britain and Ireland: illustrated with figures. In English and French. - Historia naturalis testaceorum Britanniæ, ou, la conchologie Britannique; contenant les descriptions & autres particularités d'histoire naturelle des coquilles de la Grande Bretagne & de l'Irlande: avec figures en taille douce. En anglois & françois., i-xii, 1-254, i-vii, [1, Pl. I-XVII. London. (Millan, White, Emsley & Robson)]
 Sowerby, G. B., I; Sowerby, G. B., II. (1832-1841). The conchological illustrations or, Coloured figures of all the hitherto unfigured recent shells. London, privately published
 Pennant, T. (1777). British Zoology, vol. IV. Crustacea. Mollusca. Testacea. London. i-viii, 1-154, Plates 1-93
 Payraudeau B. C. (1826). Catalogue descriptif et méthodique des Annelides et des Mollusques de l'île de Corse. Paris, 218 pp. + 8 pl.,
 Jeffreys J.G. 1884. On the Mollusca procured during the 'Lightning' and 'Porcupine' expeditions, 1868-70. (Part VIII). Proceedings of the Zoological Society of London, 1882: 341-372, pl. 26-28

glabra
Gastropods described in 1778
Taxa named by Emanuel Mendes da Costa